The First Day  may refer to:
 The First Day (David Sylvian and Robert Fripp album)
 The First Day (Kay Tse album)
 The First Day (film)
 "The First Day" (The Owl House), an episode of The Owl House